Lancaster is an unincorporated community in Lancaster Township, Jefferson County, Indiana.

History 
Lancaster was platted on Oct. 5, 1815 by David Hillis and William McFarland. The plat established 128 lots, reserving some for the construction of a courthouse, market house and place of public worship. They probably wanted to get the county seat moved from Madison. McFarland was a county judge and Hillis, a popular local politician, later became lieutenant government of Indiana.

The Lancaster Post Office operated from March 16, 1830 through August 30, 1839. Service went to Dupont, then to Republican and Franklin Mills, before returning to Lancaster on August 19, 1841. It closed on March 15, 1907.

Before the Civil War, the area was a center of anti-slavery activity. The Neal's Creek Anti-Slavery Baptist Church, founded in 1846, moved to Lancaster in 1847. It later became known as the College Hill Baptist Church and disappeared by 1879. The Eleutherian College, founded in 1848, was the second co-educational, integrated college to open in the United States. It accepted black and white students until the Civil War when it stopped accepting blacks. It closed and in 1874 then reopened as a private high school and normal school that same year. It operated until 1888 when it was purchased by Lancaster Township and the stone college building was used as an elementary school until 1937.

Lancaster was shown with 119 occupants in the 1880 census, but was not separately enumerated in any other census.

An 1889 publication gave this description: "LANCASTER, Lancaster township, is in section thirty-three, town V north, range IX east. Post office, several stores, one church, a fine merchant mill and school-house. Situated at the confluence of Big Creek and Middle Fork, on the north side of Big Creek. College Hill is just across Big Creek from Lancaster."

The 1890 Indiana Business Directory described it as follows: "Is located on Big creek in Lancaster township Jefferson county, 10 miles northwest of Madison, the county seat and banking town. Middle Fork, 3 miles east on the J. M. & I.R.R., is the shipping station. Population, 200. Mail daily. Walter McElroy, postmaster." It had a flour mills, three general stores and a hay-rake manufacturer.

Churches 
There have been several churches in the town, but histories are confused. A Christian church was founded in 1862, according to local accounts, but the church trustees sold the property on April 2, 1889. According to George Cottman’s History of Lancaster Township, the Christians took over a building that had been used by a Methodist congregation, that was failing The Christians razed the building at a date that was not given. They deeded it to J.E. McConnell who then donated it to the Methodists, who had reorganized. However, this account also says the Christians were followed by the Presbyterians, so it is unclear when the church building was demolished.

A Methodist congregation which acquired land southwest of the town on February 16, 1850, may have been the same one operating in Lancaster in 1861. But the trustees of the Lancaster Methodist Church sold their property to a private individual on March 14, 1863. Jefferson County deeds show the McConnells sold the property to trustees for a Methodist church on and January 3, 1906 and this body was still active in the 1920s.

The church that was originally named Lancaster Presbyterian Church was founded in what is now Monroe Township, which was then part of Lancaster Township. The church divided in 1839 with Monroe as a New School Presbyterian and Lancaster an Old School church, both meeting in Monroe Township. Another church called Lancaster Presbyterian was founded about 1855. A biographical sketch of Charles Lee, who was licensed to preach by the Madison Presbyterian in 1855 and ordained the same year, spent his first four years in the ministry serving Graham and Lancaster Presbyterian Church.

The Lancaster Baptist Church was formed on July 30, 1859 at Byfield’s schoolhouse, according to a history of Lancaster Township. A new building, constructed in 1900, is in use by the Bible Baptist Temple Church, a different body.

Geography

References

Further reading 

 Baker, J. David, The Postal History of Indiana, 1976, Philatelic Bibliophile, P.O. Box 213971, Louisville, Ky. 1976.
 Cottman, George S. History of Lancaster Township. Typewritten manuscript in the files of the Madison Jefferson County, Indiana, Public Library.
 Gresham, John M. & Co., 1889. Biographical & Historical Souvenir for the Counties of Clark, Crawford, Harrison, Floyd, Jefferson, Jennings, Scott and Washington.
 Indiana Department of Natural Resources. "Jefferson County, Indiana, Interim Report. Historic Landmarks Foundation of Indiana. Indianapolis, November 1989.
 Polk (1890): R.L. Polk & Co. Indiana State Gazetteer & Business Directory. 1890. Volume V. S.E. Circle and Meridian Streets, Indianapolis, Ind. Reprinted 1978-9 by The Bookmark, P.O. Box 74 Knightstown, Ind. 46148.
 Scott, Robert. W. Churches of Jefferson County, Ind. 2002 (2009 edition in progress) Available at https://web.archive.org/web/20090107002004/http://www.myindianahome.net/gen/jeff/records/church/churchhx.html

Unincorporated communities in Jefferson County, Indiana
Unincorporated communities in Indiana
1815 establishments in Indiana Territory